Tjipee Murangi (born 16 August 1986) is a Namibian professional racing cyclist. In 2009 he won the Namibian National Road Race Championships.

References

External links
 

1986 births
Living people
Namibian male cyclists
Place of birth missing (living people)